Ageratina aromatica, also known as lesser snakeroot and small-leaved white snakeroot, is a North American species of plants in the family Asteraceae. It is widespread and common across much of the eastern and southern United States from  Louisiana to Massachusetts, as far inland as Kentucky and Ohio.

Etymology
Ageratina is derived from Greek meaning 'un-aging', in reference to the flowers keeping their color for a long time. This name was used by Dioscorides for a number of different plants.

References

https://guides.nynhp.org/small-white-snakeroot/==External links==
 
 
 
 
Alabama Plants
Coastal Plain Plants

aromatica
Flora of the Northeastern United States
Plants described in 1753
Taxa named by Carl Linnaeus
Flora of the Southeastern United States
Flora without expected TNC conservation status